The Miss Nicaragua 2009 pageant, was held on March 7, 2009 in Managua, after weeks of events.  At the conclusion of the final night of competition, Indiana Sánchez won the title of Miss Universe Nicaragua 2009. She represented Nicaragua at Miss Universe 2009, held in the Bahamas later that year.  The rest of the finalists would enter different pageants.

Placements

Special awards

 Best Regional Costume - Masaya - Karen Carrión
 Most Beautiful Face - Leon - Massiel Arévalo
 Miss Photogenic - Rivas - Arlen América
 Miss Congeniality - Esteli - Yovanela Ráudez
 Miss Attitude - USA Nica - Indiana Sánchez
 Best Model - RAAN - Iris Ordeñana

Official Contestants

Trivia

Despite the fact she was born in Nicaraguan soil. Indiana Sanchez was selected in Sweetwater, Florida, USA to participate representing the Nicaraguan-American community in the National pageant. Sweetwater it is locally known as "Little Managua"

.

Judges

 Victor Manuel Garcia - Founder of TV & Novelas Magazine
 Kathy Pulido Oropeza - Venezuelan Beauty Queen's Coach
 Dr. Luis Douglas Contreras - General Manager of Dental Care
 Xiomara Blandino - Miss Nicaragua 2007
 Perrozompopo -  Nicaraguan Singer
 Lucy Valenti -  President of CANATUR (Cámara Nacional de Turismo de Nicaragua)
 Mario Sáenz Vanegas -  Director of Grupo Multicentro S.A

.

Background Music

Opening Show – Ballet Folklorico Nicarahuatl - "Los Dos Bolillos"
Swimsuit Competition - Beyoncé - "Single Ladies (Put a Ring on It)"
Evening Gown Competition – Ronald Hernandez & Mario Gutierrez - El Solar de Monimbó (Instrumental)

.

Special Guests

 Malos Habitos - "Vacio en el Espacio"

.

References

Miss Nicaragua
2009 in Nicaragua
2009 beauty pageants